Tibor Feldman (born April 25, 1947) is an American actor, having played roles in movies, television shows, television commercials, and stage plays. He has appeared in television dramas including: Law & Order, Conviction, The Sopranos, Third Watch and New York Undercover.

Career 
In 2001, he appeared on the cover of the Maxwell House Haggadah. This edition remains annually distributed during the Passover period in supermarkets across the United States. Feldman has also appeared in numerous Off-Broadway plays.

He has played roles in films including Kissing Jessica Stein, Nothin' Goes Right in which he co-starred with Rodney Dangerfield and Fat Guy Goes Nutzoid. He was also in the movie Enchanted, in which he played Henry the lawyer.
In 2006, he played Elias-Clark president Irv Ravitz in the film The Devil Wears Prada. In 2012 he starred as Reb Hersh in the independent film Where is Joel Baum?. He has starred in television commercials for companies including Microsoft, AT&T and FedEx. In 2008, Feldman played "Moe" in Goyband, which also stars Adam Pascal, Amy Davidson, Cris Judd, Tovah Feldshuh, and Natasha Lyonne. In 2017, he appeared in Keep the Change with Jessica Walter.

Filmography

Film

Television

References

External links 

 

1947 births
American male film actors
American male stage actors
American male television actors
American people of Slovak descent
Czechoslovak emigrants to the United States
Czech Jews
Jewish male actors
Living people
Male actors from New York City
People from Michalovce